Apanjan (also Apan Jan; roughly translated in English as "One's own people") is a 1968 Bengali film directed by Tapan Sinha. Set against the backdrop of the political violence that rocked India, and West Bengal in particular, in the late 1960s, it tells the story of an aged widow in a village who goes to Calcutta to stay with relatives, but faces only exploitation. She moves to a slum, and finds her "own people" in a group of educated, unemployed youth, who are caught up inexorably in the prevalent violence. The film was a commercial success, and also won the National Film Award for Best Feature Film in Bengali, 
as well as several BFJA Awards.  In 1971, it was remade in Hindi as Mere Apne by Gulzar and in 1984, in Kannada as Benki Birugali.

Plot
Anandamoyee (Chhaya Devi) is a childless widow in a Bengal village. One day a man turns up, claiming to be her nephew. He takes her to live with him and his family in Calcutta. In the city, she experiences something akin to culture shock, as she encounters children begging on the streets and day-to-day violence. She finds the idea of women working at office jobs very strange, and even wearing any kind of footwear is new for her. The couple with whom she lives want her to look after their child, which she does gladly since they are her "own people". However, eventually she realises that she is being exploited as an unpaid nanny. She moves out to a downbeat area of the city, to look after two street children. They are part of the 'family' of Robi (Swaroop Dutta), the leader of a gang of educated young men who are active participants in the street violence that engulfs the city. With these outsiders, Anandamoyee feels a sort of kinship, and even a sense of being in a family, which she never enjoyed with her actor husband. Robi's gang is always at daggers drawn with a rival gang led by Chheno (Samit Bhanja). The two gangs are enlisted by cynical politicians, to serve their own ends. The gang war continues, albeit with an ostensibly political colour, reaching a melodramatic climax, with a tragic resolution.

Cast
 Chhaya Devi as Anandamoyee
 Swarup Dutta as Robi
 Samit Bhanja as Chheno
 Rabi Ghosh
 Sumita Sanyal
 Juin Banerjee
 Chinmoy Roy as Anandamoyee's husband
 Bhanu Bandopadhyay
 Kalyan Chatterjee

Reception
Apanjan  was the first film to deal with contemporary political  violence and urban angst in West Bengal, and indeed India. It was a good two years ahead of better known films that dealt with urban issues, such as Satyajit Ray's Pratidwandi and Mrinal Sen's Interview. When it was released in 1968, it struck a chord with urban audiences, and was a commercial success. It gave a boost to the careers of Swaroop Dutta and Samit Bhanja, catapulting the latter to stardom. The use of Rabindrasangeet in the film was unusual, and added to its popularity with middle-class audiences.

Critically, too, the film was well received at the time. It dominated the 1969 BFJA Awards, besides winning the National Award for Best Feature Film in Bengali.

Three years later, Tapan Sinha returned to the problems faced by urban youth in Ekhoni, which was also well received.

Preservation 
Apanjan has been restored and digitised by the National Film Archive of India.

Remake
In 1971, Gulzar made his directorial debut with Mere Apne, which was almost a frame by frame remake of Apanjan. It starred Meena Kumari in the lead role which was successful at Box office.

Awards
16th National Film Awards 
National Film Award for Best Feature Film in Bengali
Bengal Film Journalists' Association Awards (1969)
 Best Indian film (jointly with 9 others)
 Best Director - Tapan Sinha
 Best Screenplay - Tapan Sinha
 Best Actor In a Supporting Role - Samit Bhanja
 Best Cinematography (Black And White) - Bimal Mukherjee
 Best Editing - Subodh Roy
 Best Audiography - Anil Talukdar and Atul Chatterjee

References

External links
 

Bengali-language Indian films
1968 films
Films set in Kolkata
Bengali films remade in other languages
Indian black-and-white films
Best Bengali Feature Film National Film Award winners
Films directed by Tapan Sinha
1960s Bengali-language films